A Very Capable Life: The Autobiography of Zarah Petri is a non-fiction memoir of his mother by the Canadian television host Johnnie Walters, written under his real name John Leigh Walters and published in January 2010 by Athabasca University Press. It re-tells the stories his mother described to him regarding her immigration to Canada in the 1920s. Walters gives his first person account using humor, and intrigue, to share his mother's expressed regards about her depression era experiences.

Awards and honours
A Very Capable Life won the 2010 "Edna Staebler Award for Creative Non-Fiction".

See also
List of Edna Staebler Award recipients

References

External links
AU Press, A Very Capable Life, Retrieved 11/23/2012

Canadian non-fiction books
2010 non-fiction books
Works about human migration